L.R. Vicenza, commonly referred to as Vicenza, is an Italian football club based in Vicenza, Veneto. Founded in 1902 as Associazione del Calcio in Vicenza, they became Lanerossi Vicenza in 1953, then Vicenza Calcio from 1990 to 2018, a year which saw the club going bankrupt and being put under controlled administration in order to preserve the Serie C spot at the end of the 2017–18 season. Renzo Rosso, owner of fashion brand Diesel, merged its Bassano Virtus and some of the assets of Vicenza Calcio into one team, L.R. Vicenza Virtus, which will play in Vicenza, while the two sides will preserve their distinct youth teams. Vicenza is the oldest team in Veneto; officially founded on 9 March 1902 by the then dean of Liceo Lioy, Tito Buy, and the physical education teacher of the same school, Libero Antonio Scarpa.

The club currently plays in Italy's Serie C, having spent the entire 1960s, most of the 1970s and a large part of the 1990s in Serie A.  They won the 1996-97 Coppa Italia and reached the semi finals of the Cup Winners' Cup the following season, losing to eventual winners Chelsea.

History

Vicenza competed in the Italian Championship for the first time in 1911; reaching the finals for the title before being defeated by Pro Vercelli, one of the top Italian clubs at the time. During the 1920s and the 1930s, the team played in the lower divisions, reaching the first division for the first time in 1942. In the last round of the season, a 6–2 win versus Juventus in Turin, meant a final relegation escape.

In 1947, Vicenza finished fifth in Serie A, but were relegated at the end of the following season.

Lanerossi Vicenza

The early 1950s were quite troublesome due to economic problems, but in 1953 the club was bought by Lanerossi, a woollen firm from Schio, with the side being renamed Lanerossi Vicenza.

Between 1955 and 1975 Vicenza never left the top level, always putting a hard fight against more established clubs. In this period the side was also known as Nobile Provinciale (Noble Provincial). 

In 1964 and 1966 it finished 6th, with the Brazilian Luis Vinicio finishing league's top-scorer in the former with 25 goals.

In 1975 the club was relegated, however, after winning the 1976–77 second division, they would eventually finish runners-up in the following season with a young Paolo Rossi led the scoring charts with 24 goals. In that year the side was nicknamed Real Vicenza. Club chairman Giuseppe Farina had just bought the striker from Juventus for a then record fee of 2.6 billion lire, but the team would eventually drop two divisions in just three seasons.

In the mid-1980s, Roberto Baggio started his career at the club, leading it in 1984-85 to the Serie B. In 1986 Vicenza achieved a top flight promotion that was subsequently denied due to its involvement in the second Totonero match-fixing scandal.  The club was soon relegated back to Serie C1.

Vicenza Calcio

In 1990 Vicenza took back its current name and was promoted to Serie B in 1993, thanks to coach Renzo Ulivieri. His successor, Francesco Guidolin took the team back to Serie A in 1995, and led it through successive successful seasons. After finishing ninth in the league, the club won the 1996–97 Italian Cup with a 3–1 aggregate win over Napoli, eventually reaching next year's Cup Winners' Cup semi-finals, being defeated by Chelsea after winning the first leg in Vicenza for 1–0.

In 1999 the team was relegated to Serie B and after a return to the top flight in 2000–01, was relegated to Lega Pro Prima Divisione in 2005, after losing a relegation playout against Triestina. However, the club was readmitted to Serie B as F.I.G.C. had determined that Genoa C.F.C. had fixed the final match of the season.

In the season 2011–12 the club was relegated to Lega Pro Prima Divisione after losing the relegation play-off against Empoli. Vicenza, however, were reinstated in Serie B at the eve of the 2012–13 season in place of Lecce for its role in the 2011–12 Italian football scandal. However, the club finished the 2012–13 in 19th place; missing out on the play-out and were finally relegated after reprieves in the previous two seasons.

Vicenza ended the 2013–14 season in fifth place, being successively defeated by Savona in the promotion play-offs, and were due to play the 2014–15 season in the unified Lega Pro division, that would have featured an unprecedented crosstown derby against Real Vicenza. However, the dissolution of Siena meant Vicenza were promoted to become the 22nd team in Serie B. Vicenza were relegated again at the conclusion of the 2016–17 Serie B after finishing 20th.

Changes in ownership
The club entered a debt restructuring process since March 2016, which the new director stating that the club required a re-capitalization of at least €20 million. Vi.Fin. S.p.A., a special purpose vehicle for a consortium of new investors, provided just €2.5 million new shares of the club in May 2016. Immediately before the recapitalization, Vi.Fin. acquired most of the shares of the club from Finalfa S.r.l., a company owned by Sergio Cassingena.

Former Vicenza chairman Tiziano Cunico and CEO Dario Cassingena were also sued by the prosecutor of Italian Football Federation (FIGC) in September 2016 for allegations of reporting false profits from player exchanges with Parma; where prices were inflated relative to their performances in the first team. The players under the investigation that involving Vicenza were Sandrini (sold to Parma for Malivojević; both players were tagged for €1.2 million) Eventually the club and directors were inadmissible from the charge due to expiry of the legal proceeding. In a different matter, Dario Cassingena was sentenced 10 months (in probation) by the Court of Vicenza, after the football club failed to paid the value-added tax in time.

On 1 June 2017 the contract of general manager Andrea Gazzoli was resolved in a mutual consent and on 5 June, Alfredo Pastorelli resigned as the chairman; citing the financial troubles of the club. On 10 July 2017, Luxembourg-based Boreas Capital Sàrl announced it would buy the club. The parent company of Boreas Capital was Dubai-based G.S. Holding.

However, the club faced another financial trouble during the first season of new ownership. Football Italia reported that the club failed to pay the wage since September 2017.

Vicenza was declared bankrupt on 18 January 2018. The team finished as the 17th of the group B of 2017–18 Serie C season, beating Santarcangelo in a relegation "play-out" matches.

The Rosso years: L.R. Vicenza Virtus/L.R. Vicenza
On 24 May 2018, Bassano Virtus, a fellow Serie C team also from the Province of Vicenza owned by Renzo Rosso and his family, were relocated to Vicenza for the 2018–19 Serie C, starting using also the white-and-red Vicenza colours and being renamed L.R. Vicenza Virtus, while keeping both the youth systems of Vicenza and Bassano. The new club was lately formalized as a merger between the original Vicenza and Bassano Virtus, following Rosso family's OTB Group's acquisition of some of the assets of Vicenza Calcio in order to make the merger possible.

The newly-formed L.R. Vicenza Virtus finished in eighth place in the 2018–19 Serie C season. They were promoted the following season as Group B champions, thus marking Vicenza's return to Serie B after just two years.

On 1 July 2021, the club dropped "Virtus" from its official name, thus being renamed L.R. Vicenza S.p.A..

Kit Manufacturer and sponsors

Kit Manufacturer

Sponsors
 ?–2017: Banca Popolare di Vicenza
 2017–2018: Acciaierie Valbruna

Honours

Domestic

League
Serie B
Winners: 1954–55, 1976–77, 1999–2000
Serie C
Winners:  1932–33, 1939–40, 2019–20

Cups
Coppa Italia
Winners: 1996–97
Coppa Italia Serie C
Winners: 1981–82

International friendly
Benelux Cup
Winners: 1961
Uhrencup
Winners: 1965

Divisional movements

Players

Current squad

Out on loan

Retired numbers
3 –  Giulio Savoini
25 –  Piermario Morosini, Midfielder (2007–09, 2011) – posthumous honour.

Notable former players

 Roberto Baggio
 Paolo Rossi

Notable former managers

In Europe
source:

UEFA Cup Winners' Cup

UEFA Cup

References

External links

 

 
Football clubs in Italy
Association football clubs established in 1902
Football clubs in Veneto
L.R. Vicenza Virtus
L.R. Vicenza Virtus
Italian football First Division clubs
Serie A clubs
Serie B clubs
Serie C clubs
Serie D clubs
Coppa Italia winning clubs
1902 establishments in Italy
Re-established companies
Phoenix clubs (association football)
Coppa Italia Serie C winning clubs